Ancylosis detersella is a species of snout moth in the genus Ancylosis. It was described by George Hampson in 1926. It is found in South Africa.

References

Endemic moths of South Africa
Moths described in 1860
detersella
Moths of Africa